Mission 11 July is a 2010 Indian Hindi-language film directed by Manoj B Jangid. The film stars Vikram Gokhale, Mukesh Tiwari, Tarun Khanna and Nattasha Singh. It deals with the sensitive subject of terrorism. The movie suggests that people are not born terrorists, yet the wrong influences and circumstances may make them so. Mission 11 July preaches that just how the wrong influences can make a terrorist, the perfect influencers may be able to  change people as they end terrorism and killing in the name of the religion.

Plot 
Mission 11 July is a story set in the slum area of Mumbai's 'Bhandup', India. The story revolves around a simple lower middle class Muslim boy called Shahid (Tarun Khanna), who is very poor but is living a happy existence with his mother (Joyshree Arora) and his beloved girlfriend Raavi (Nattasha Singh) who is a Hindu but the difference in religion does not matter to their love. His life is simple and full of love and laughter till he meets a professor (Pramod Moutho) who starts brainwashing him into believing that Muslims are treated badly and given second hand and low treatment in India.

Due to his respect and love for the professor and his own past where his father had been killed in the riots when he was a child, Shahid starts getting disturbed by the professor's talk and actually starts believing in them, and finally one day, when he sees his dear professor being taken away by the Anti Terrorist Squad, he remembers his own father's death in the communal riots and gets fully convinced that his community is being ill-treated in the country where he lives.

Not realizing that the Professor was a wrong influence and has affected his entire thinking process, he is convinced that the professor has unnecessarily been arrested! He now makes up his mind that the professor was right! He has to become a terrorist to help his kind, the Muslim. He decides to leave his home and  his mother and  his beloved girlfriend Raavi who try their best to stop him and when they can't, they refuse to stand by his decision to join a group of Jihadis.

Shahid's life changes fully and he becomes as hard as nails thinking that he is doing good for Islam, and saving his people by killing the Hindus.

5 years pass. Killing becomes something he feels he is doing for the good of his people as that's the only way to help them. That's how well the professor had brainwashed him. He never questions the path he's on until the day when everything changes.

Shahid and his partner Aftab (Mukesh Tiwari) have been given the Mission to bomb the Parliament of India in Delhi for which they have to kidnap the Police commissioner's (Vikram Gokhale) family, hence blackmailing and coercing him into driving them to their destination, the Parliament House to which he has free access, in his own car!

They have to spend one night at the Police Commissioners house as their Mission to blow up the Parliament House is planned for the next day, 11 July.

And in that one night things turn around once again. Their souls which had fallen asleep are forced to wake up.

The police commissioner Abbas Ali who is also a Muslim has never felt ill-treated in his country, the talks he has with Shahid and Aftab shake their souls up and make them doubt the validity of their Mission.  The Commissioner Abbas Ali Baig takes the decision that he won't betray the country he lives in no matter what. As a true Patriot, he decides he'd rather let his family die than help the terrorists to blow up the Parliament house just to save his family.

On 11 July as they are preparing to leave they hear of another group of terrorists who have bombed the trains in Mumbai 11 July 2006 Mumbai train bombings and the people who have died in the bombings are not from any particular caste; they are just Indians.

Shahid and Aftab  are shaken up and realize that even though the Commissioner is from the same religion of Islam as they are, he is still ready to die for his country and countrymen because he feels he belongs to his country first. Consequently, they have a change of heart and realize that it's not about which community or caste or religion or even country one belongs to. Acknowledging that the ones who die in any terror attack are humans first, they decide to give up their Mission to bomb the Parliament House and surrender themselves to the Indian Police Service.

Cast 
 Vikram Gokhale as Police Commissioner Abbas Ali Baig
 Mukesh Tiwari as Aftab
 Tarun Khanna as Shahid
 Nattasha Singh as Raavi
 Pramod Moutho as The Professor
 Neena Kulkarni as Police Commissioner's wife
 Joyshree Arora as Shahid's mother

Production 
This marks the feature film debut of television actress Nattasha Singh.

Reception 
A critic from The Indian Express wrote that "Another film that sets out to tell us how ordinary Muslim youth become disaffected and angry. Another long, hard-to-watch talkathon".

References 

2010 films
Films shot in India
2010s Hindi-language films